Parker County is a county located in the U.S. state of Texas. As of the 2020 census, its population was 148,222. The county seat is Weatherford. The county was created in 1855 and organized the following year. It is named for Isaac Parker, a state legislator who introduced the bill that established the county in 1855.

Parker County is included in the Dallas-Fort Worth-Arlington metropolitan statistical area.

Geography 
The county is intersected by the Brazos River.

Highest point 

They are located just east of the Advance community, southwest of Poolville.

Major highways

Adjacent counties 
 Wise County (north)
 Tarrant County (east)
 Johnson County (southeast)
 Hood County (south)
 Palo Pinto County (west)
 Jack County (northwest)
 The following demographics have been provided by the Parker County Economic Development Council which is a 501(c)(6) business league. We are dedicated to the retention of our current businesses and aide in managing the incoming businesses. For more information following the link http://parkercountyedc.com/ we are here to help inform our community!

Communities

Cities (multiple counties)
 Azle (mostly in Tarrant County)
 Cresson (partly in Hood and Johnson counties)
 Fort Worth (mostly in Tarrant County, with small parts in Denton, Johnson, Wise, and Parker counties)
 Mineral Wells (mostly in Palo Pinto County)
 Reno (small part in Tarrant County)

Cities

 Aledo
 Hudson Oaks
 Weatherford (county seat)
 Willow Park

Towns

 Annetta
 Annetta North
 Annetta South
 Brock
 Cool
 Millsap
 Peaster
 Sanctuary
 Springtown

Census-designated places
 Briar (partly in Wise and Tarrant counties)
 Carter
 Dennis
 Garner
 Horseshoe Bend
 Western Lake

Unincorporated communities
 Goshen
 Poolville
 Whitt
 Peaster

Demographics 

Note: the US Census treats Hispanic/Latino as an ethnic category. This table excludes Latinos from the racial categories and assigns them to a separate category. Hispanics/Latinos can be of any race.

In 2000, the county had a population of 88,495; by 2020, its population increased to 148,222. Among the 2020 population, the racial and ethnic makeup was 79.44% non-Hispanic white, 13.37% Hispanic or Latino of any race, 4.44% multiracial, 1.10% Black or African American, 0.67% Asian alone, 0.59% American Indian and Alaska Native, 0.32% some other race, and 0.07% Pacific Islander.

Politics 
Parker County, like most suburban counties in the Dallas–Fort Worth metropolitan area, has been a Republican stronghold for decades. Republicans have held all public offices since 1999 and the county has not voted for a Democratic presidential candidate since 1976.

Notable people
 Oliver Loving, Loving-Goodnight Cattle Trail
 Bose Ikard, trusted cattle driver of Oliver Loving and Charles Goodnight
 Mary Martin, star of stage and screen
 S.W.T. Lanham, last Confederate veteran to serve as governor of Texas
 Jim Wright, youngest mayor of Weatherford, TX, Speaker of the U.S. House of Representatives

See also

 List of museums in North Texas
 National Register of Historic Places listings in Parker County, Texas
 Recorded Texas Historic Landmarks in Parker County

References

External links
 Parker County government's website
 The Parker County Poor Farm
 Historic photos from the Weatherford College Library, hosted by the Portal to Texas History
 Parker County in Handbook of Texas Online

 
Dallas–Fort Worth metroplex
1856 establishments in Texas
Populated places established in 1856